God's Beautiful City is a gospel album by Little Richard, recorded at unknown dates in Nashville, 1979.

After recording the album, Richard went on to record two unreleased tracks on June 17, 1981 – "One Day at a Time" and "Where Will I Go Without the Lord?" – before his career fell dormant once more. Some of the tracks have 1978 copyright dates to suggest a 1978 recording, though April 1979 has been reported.

Reception
The album drew mixed reviews and sold poorly. The Encyclopedia of Contemporary Christian Music called the music "nondescript," while The New Rolling Stone Album Guide considered it unfortunate that the album had gone out of print.

Track listing 
Side one
 "There Is Someone (Worse Off Than I Am)"
 "If You Got the Lord on Your Side (Everything Will Be Alright)"
 "It Is No Secret (What God Can Do)"
 "I Surrender All"

Side two
 "Little Richard's Testimony: 1) What Am I Supposed to Do Without Jesus"
 "Little Richard's Testimony: 1) Come By Here, My Lord; 2) God's Beautiful City"

Personnel
Little Richard – piano, vocals
Plus unknown personnel on piano, bass, organ, vocals and drums.

References

1979 albums
Little Richard albums